The 2020 Challenger Eckental was a professional tennis tournament played on carpet courts. It was the 24th edition of the tournament which was part of the 2020 ATP Challenger Tour. It took place in Eckental, Germany between 2 and 8 November 2020.

Singles main-draw entrants

Seeds

 1 Rankings are as of 26 October 2020.

Other entrants
The following players received wildcards into the singles main draw:
  Maximilian Marterer
  Max Hans Rehberg
  Mats Rosenkranz

The following player received entry into the singles main draw using a protected ranking:
  Dustin Brown

The following players received entry into the singles main draw as alternates:
  Teymuraz Gabashvili 
  Julian Lenz

The following players received entry from the qualifying draw:
  Duje Ajduković
  Geoffrey Blancaneaux
  Johannes Härteis
  Marvin Möller

The following player received entry as a lucky loser:
  Matthias Bachinger

Champions

Singles

 Sebastian Korda def.  Ramkumar Ramanathan 6–4, 6–4.

Doubles

 Dustin Brown /  Antoine Hoang def.  Lloyd Glasspool /  Alex Lawson 6–7(8–10), 7–5, [13–11].

References

2020 ATP Challenger Tour
2020
2020 in German tennis
November 2020 sports events in Germany